Saikou Touray (born 6 June 2000) is a Gambian professional footballer who plays as a midfielder for Grenobole in the French Ligue 2.

Professional career
Touray is a youth product of the Gambian club Superstars Academy FC, and first moved to Israel on loan with Beitar Netanya in 2018. On 12 May 2019, he signed his first professional contract with Maccabi Haifa for 5 seasons. He had successive loans with Sektzia Ness Ziona, Ironi Kiryat Shmona, and Hapoel Haifa. On 19 July 2022, he transferred to the French Ligue 2 club Grenobole.

References

External links
 

2000 births
Living people
Gambian footballers
Association football midfielders
Maccabi Haifa F.C. players
Sektzia Ness Ziona F.C. players
Hapoel Ironi Kiryat Shmona F.C. players
Hapoel Haifa F.C. players
Grenoble Foot 38 players
Israeli Premier League players
Ligue 2 players
Gambian expatriate footballers
Expatriate footballers in France
Expatriate footballers in Israel
Gambian expatriate sportspeople in France
Gambian expatriate sportspeople in Israel